Burke Centre is a planned residential community located west of Burke in Fairfax County, Virginia, United States. Burke Centre is a planned community managed by the Burke Centre Conservancy homeowners' association (HOA). 

Burke Centre is also the name of a census-designated place (CDP). The CDP boundaries extend beyond the planned community limits. As of the 2010 census, the Burke Centre CDP had a total population of 17,326.

Burke Centre is located south of the center of Fairfax County. It is bordered to the east and partially to the north by the Burke CDP, and to the west and north by the Fairfax Station CDP. The Burke Centre CDP border follows Ox Road to the west, the VRE Manassas Line to the north, Burke Lake Road to the southeast, and Fairfax County Parkway to the southwest.

Neighborhoods 
Burke Centre is divided into five neighborhoods: The Woods, The Oaks, the Commons, the Ponds, and the Landings. Each neighborhood's name appears frequently in streets within its boundaries (e.g. the Woods neighborhood contains Wooden Hawk Lane, Walnut Wood Court, etc.). Not all streets contain the neighborhood name, however. Additionally, each neighborhood has one public pool and one community center, generally located on the same lot.

The locations of each neighborhood is as follows:
The Ponds is bound by Burke Centre Parkway to the north, Burke Lake Road to the east and south, Roberts Parkway to the west, and Fairfax County Parkway (SR 286) to the southwest.
The Woods is just north of Burke Centre Parkway, across from The Ponds; it is bordered by The Commons to the west and Burke Lake Road to the east.
The Commons is located primarily around Burke Commons Road, which runs mostly parallel with Roberts Parkway. It is bound by The Woods to the east and The Landings to the west.
The Landings is west of Roberts Parkway, and exists on both sides of Burke Centre Parkway. It is constrained by Fairfax County Parkway (SR 286) to the south and The Oaks to the west.
The Oaks is just west of The Landings; it borders The Landings to the east, Ox Road (SR 123) to the west, and Fairfax County Parkway (SR 286) to the south.

References

External links 
 Burke Centre Conservancy

Census-designated places in Fairfax County, Virginia
Census-designated places in Virginia
Washington metropolitan area